Geoffrey Charles Goodacre (18 June 1927 – 30 June 2004) was an Australian hurdler. He competed in the men's 400 metres hurdles at the 1956 Summer Olympics.

References

External links
 
 

1927 births
2004 deaths
Athletes (track and field) at the 1956 Summer Olympics
Australian male hurdlers
Olympic athletes of Australia
Place of birth missing
Commonwealth Games medallists in athletics
Commonwealth Games bronze medallists for Australia
Athletes (track and field) at the 1950 British Empire Games
20th-century Australian people
21st-century Australian people
Medallists at the 1950 British Empire Games